Lisamaria Meirowsky (* September 17, 1904 in Graudenz; † August 9, 1942 in Auschwitz) was a German dermatologist and pediatrician murdered by the Nazis because of her Jewish heritage.

Life 
Lisamaria Meirowsky was the daughter of the dermatologist Emil Meirowsky, who opened a practice in Cologne-Lindenthal in 1908. After graduating from high school in Cologne, she began studying medicine at the Friedrich Wilhelm University in Bonn in 1923. In 1925, she went to Munich for two years to continue her medical studies. Back in Bonn, she graduated in 1929. She received her doctorate from the Ludwig Maximilian University in Munich in 1933. The title of the dissertation in the field of dermatology was "Über das Krankheitsbild des Erythema palmoplantare symmetricum hereditarium." After a long illness, she went to Rome in 1933, obtained a doctorate in the field of pediatrics, and there made the acquaintance of the Dominican friar Franziskus Maria Stratmann She converted from Judaism to Catholicism on October 15, 1933, and took the name Maria Magdalena Dominika in the Third Order of St. Dominic.

Nazi persecution 
In 1938, persecuted as a "non-Aryan" despite her conversion, Meirowsky went to Utrecht in the Netherlands with the Dominican Fr. Stratmann. In October 1941 she went into hiding in the Trappist Abbey of Our Lady of Koningsoord near Tilburg, where she worked as a doctor and porter. On July 26, 1942, the Archbishop of Utrecht, Jan de Jong, had a pastoral letter read out against the Germans' actions against the Jews. In response, on August 2, 1942, 244 former Jews who had converted to Catholicism, among them Lisamaria Meirowsky and the siblings Edith and Rosa Stein, were arrested by the Gestapo and deported to the Westerbork concentration camp, probably on August 4, 1942. From there they were taken to the Auschwitz concentration camp on August 7, 1942, and murdered on August 9.

Commemoration 
The Catholic Church included Lisamaria Meirowsky as a witness of faith in the German Martyrology of the 20th century. In May 2014, a commemorative paving stone was laid in front of her last residence in Cologne-Lindenthal at Fürst-Pückler-Strasse 42 by students of a Cologne high school.

Publications 

 Über das Krankheitsbild des Erythema palmoplantare symmetricum hereditarium, Springer, Berlin 1933

Literature 

 Franziskus Stratmann: Die Todesgefährtin Edith Steins: Lisamaria Meirowsky. Christ in der Gegenwart, 19, 1968
 Helmut Moll (Hrsg. im Auftrag der Deutschen Bischofskonferenz), Zeugen für Christus. Das deutsche Martyrologium des 20. Jahrhunderts, Paderborn u. a. 1999, 7. überarbeitete und aktualisierte Auflage 2019, ISBN 978-3-506-78012-6, Band I, S. 385–388.
 Walter Tetzlaff: 2000 Kurzbiographien bedeutender deutscher Juden des 20. Jahrhunderts. Askania, Lindhorst 1982, ISBN 3-921730-10-4.
 Elisabeth Prégardier, Anne Mohr (Hrsg.): Passion im August – Edith Stein und Gefährtinnen: Weg in Tod und Auferstehung. Plöger Verlag, Annweiler 1995, ISBN 978-3-898-57067-1.
 P. W. F. M. Hamans: Edith Stein and Companions: On the Way to Auschwitz. Ignatius Press, 2010, S. 181–194.

References

External links 

 
 Märtyrer des Erzbistums Köln Dr. Dr. Lisamaria Meirowsky
 Digital Monument to the Jewish Community in the Netherlands: Lisamaria Meirowsky
 Erzbistum Köln: Märtyrer des Erzbistums Köln - Dr. Dr. Lisamaria Meirowsky

1904 births
1942 deaths
Jewish emigrants from Nazi Germany to the Netherlands
German people who died in Auschwitz concentration camp
Nazi Germany and Catholicism
20th-century physicians
Jews who died in the Holocaust